The 1964 Concordia Cobbers football team was an American football team that represented Concordia College of Moorhead, Minnesota, as a member of the Minnesota Intercollegiate Athletic Conference (MIAC) during the 1964 NAIA football season. In their 24th year under head coach Jake Christiansen, the Cobbers compiled a 10–0–1 record (7–0 against conference opponents), won the MIAC championship, and tied Sam Houston State in the Champion Bowl to share the NAIA national championship.

Junior fullback Dave Heide totaled 993 rushing yards in nine regular-season games. Four Cobbers received first-team honors on the 1964 All-MIAC football team selected by the conference coaches: Heide; senior quarterback Bob Nick (praised for his "versatility and amazing football sense"); senior end Paul Brynteson (chosen for his "blocking strength", "pass-catching moves", and "place-kicking toe"); and linebacker Bob Braun (described as "a 200-pound socker").

Concordia had a total enrollment in the fall of 1964 of 1,800 students.

Schedule

References

Concordia Cobbers
Concordia Cobbers football seasons
NAIA Football National Champions
College football undefeated seasons
Concordia Cobbers football